Emily Nicole Boyd (born July 25, 1996) is an American professional soccer player who currently plays for the HB Køge of the Elitedivisionen.

College career
Emily Boyd played four years for the University of California-Berkeley Golden Bears. During her time at Cal she made 85 appearances and finished with 36 career shutouts, twice setting the Cal single season shutout record.  Her freshman year she was named the First Team Freshman All-American and Pac-12 All-Freshman Team. She followed this with All-Pac-12 Second Team honors in her sophomore and junior years. Her senior year she was named to the All-American Second team and All-Pac-12 First team and became the first Cal Bear to win the Pac-12 Goalkeeper of the Year award. While at the University of California-Berkeley Boyd majored in Sports Business and Marketing.

Professional career

Chicago Red Stars, 2018–
Emily Boyd was drafted in round 2, 15th overall, of the 2018 NWSL College Draft by the Chicago Red Stars.  She was signed by the team in March  2019. During her first season, 2018, Boyd made 2 starts with 2 shutouts for the Red Stars.  Boyd's 2019 season also started off very well, seeing her nominated for the NWSL Save of the Week in two of her first three starts.

International career
Emily Boyd has been called up to camps by the United States at the U-15, U-18, U-20 and U-23 levels.

Career statistics 
As of May 20, 2019

References

External links
 NWSL
 Chicago Red Stars
 

Living people
1996 births
American women's soccer players
California Golden Bears women's soccer players
National Women's Soccer League players
Chicago Red Stars draft picks
Soccer players from Seattle
Chicago Red Stars players
Women's association football goalkeepers
American expatriate sportspeople in Denmark
Expatriate women's footballers in Denmark
American expatriate women's soccer players
HB Køge (women) players